Death receptor 5 (DR5), also known as TRAIL receptor 2 (TRAILR2) and tumor necrosis factor receptor superfamily member 10B (TNFRSF10B), is a cell surface receptor of the TNF-receptor superfamily that binds TRAIL and mediates apoptosis.

Function 

The protein encoded by this gene is a member of the TNF-receptor superfamily, and contains an intracellular death domain. This receptor can be activated by tumor necrosis factor-related apoptosis inducing ligand (TNFSF10/TRAIL/APO-2L), and transduces apoptosis signal. Mice have a homologous gene, tnfrsf10b, that has been essential in the elucidation of the function of this gene in humans. Studies with FADD-deficient mice suggested that FADD, a death domain containing adaptor protein, is required for the apoptosis mediated by this protein.

Interactions 

DR5 has been shown to interact with:
 Caspase 8,
 Caspase 10, 
 FADD,  and
 TRAIL.

Cancer therapy
Monoclonal antibodies targeting DR5 have been developed and are currently under clinical trials for patients suffer from a variety of cancer types, see Tigatuzumab (CS-1008).

Luminescent iridium complex-peptide hybrids, serving as TRAIL mimics, have been designed, which target the death receptors DR4 and DR5 on cancer cells and induce their apoptosis.

See also 
 Cluster of differentiation
 Tumor necrosis factor receptor
 Tigatuzumab

References

Further reading

External links 
 

Clusters of differentiation
TNF receptor family